James Maguire (born 28 September 1939) is a Canadian basketball player. He competed in the men's tournament at the 1964 Summer Olympics.

References

1939 births
Living people
Canadian men's basketball players
Olympic basketball players of Canada
Basketball players at the 1964 Summer Olympics
Basketball players from Toronto
People from Weston, Toronto